The Madagali suicide bombings occurred on 9 December 2016 when 2  women suicide bombers attack Madagali, a town in Nigeria. The attack killed at least 57 people and injured 177. Among those individuals injured 120 were reported to be children. "Officials have blamed the Boko Haram Islamic extremists."

See also
List of Islamist terrorist attacks
List of terrorist incidents in December 2016
List of terrorist incidents linked to ISIL
Number of terrorist incidents by country
Timeline of ISIL-related events (2016)

References

2016 murders in Nigeria
Mass murder in 2016
2010s massacres in Nigeria
Suicide bombings in Nigeria
Terrorist incidents in Nigeria in 2016
December 2016 crimes in Africa